Yury Nazarov (born November 13, 1992) is a Russian professional ice hockey player. He is currently playing with Amur Khabarovsk of the Kontinental Hockey League (KHL).

Nazarov made his Kontinental Hockey League debut playing with Metallurg Novokuznetsk during the 2010–11 KHL season.

References

External links

1992 births
Living people
Amur Khabarovsk players
Metallurg Novokuznetsk players
Russian ice hockey forwards
Universiade medalists in ice hockey
Universiade bronze medalists for Russia
Competitors at the 2013 Winter Universiade
People from Novokuznetsk
Sportspeople from Kemerovo Oblast